
Larati Lake is a lake in the Cochabamba Department, Bolivia. At an elevation of 3585 m, its surface area is 1.36 km².

References 

Lakes of Cochabamba Department